Ihor Berezovskyi (born 24 August 1990) is a Ukrainian professional footballer who most recently played as a goalkeeper for SV Darmstadt 98.

Career
Berezovskyi is a product of youth team systems of Kirovohrad city. He made his debut for FC Obolon Kyiv entering as a substituted player in a game against FC Shakhtar Donetsk on 9 April 2011 in the Ukrainian Premier League. FC Obolon Kyiv dissolved itself in February 2013.

On 22 July 2013, Berezovskyi joined Belgian Pro League side Lierse S.K. on a three-year contract.

References

External links

1990 births
Living people
Association football goalkeepers
Ukrainian footballers
Sportspeople from Kropyvnytskyi
FC Zirka Kropyvnytskyi players
FC Obolon-Brovar Kyiv players
Ukrainian Premier League players
Legia Warsaw players
Lierse S.K. players
Sint-Truidense V.V. players
SV Darmstadt 98 players
Belgian Pro League players
Challenger Pro League players
Ukrainian expatriate sportspeople in Poland
Ukrainian expatriate footballers
Expatriate footballers in Poland
Ukrainian expatriate sportspeople in Belgium
Expatriate footballers in Belgium
Expatriate footballers in Germany
Ukrainian expatriate sportspeople in Germany